Norwest may refer to:

Businesses and organizations 

 Norwest Corporation, a bank based in Minneapolis, Minnesota that operated from 1929 to 1998
 Norwest United, an Association Football Club in Auckland, New Zealand
 Norwest Venture Partners, an investment firm based in Palo Alto, California
 Rochdale Society of Equitable Pioneers, a co-operative that traded as Norwest from 1982 to 1991
 Vinci SA, parent company of Norwest Holst

Places 

 Norwest, New South Wales, a suburb of Sydney, Australia
 Norwest Business Park, in Norwest, New South Wales
 Norwest railway station, in Norwest, New South Wales
 Wells Fargo Arena (Tempe, Arizona), formerly Norwest Arena
 Wells Fargo Center (Minneapolis), formerly the Norwest Center

Other uses 

 Henry Norwest (1884–1918), Canadian soldier
 HMS Sealark (1903), a steam yacht renamed the Norwest